"James Dean (I Wanna Know)" is a song by British singer Daniel Bedingfield. It was released in August 2002 as the second single from his debut studio album, Gotta Get Thru This. Like his debut single "Gotta Get Thru This", "James Dean" was also a hit, reaching number four on the UK Singles Chart, making it his second top-10 hit. It entered the top 20 in Australia, peaking at number 19. The song name checks Freddie Mercury, Brad Pitt, Sly Stone and Daddy Warbucks.

Dom Passantino of Stylus Magazine described the song as "one final attempt at bedroom bounce-pop weirdness." Tom Ewing of Freaky Trigger found the song's electro to be harsher than on previous efforts.

Track listings
 UK and Australian CD single
 "James Dean (I Wanna Know)"
 "Gotta Get Thru This" (acoustic version)
 "James Dean (I Wanna Know)" (ATFC's committed vocal mix)
 "James Dean (I Wanna Know)" (video)

 UK 12-inch single
A1. "James Dean (I Wanna Know)" (ATFC's committed vocal)
A2. "James Dean (I Wanna Know)" (M & M vocal mix)
B1. "James Dean (I Wanna Know)" (Todd Edwards Life Line vocal remix)
B2. "James Dean (I Wanna Know)" (Izzy B vocal mix)

 UK cassette single and European CD single
 "James Dean (I Wanna Know)"
 "Gotta Get Thru This" (acoustic version)

Credits and personnel
Credits are lifted from the Gotta Get Thru This album booklet.

Studios
 Recorded and mixed at Metropolis Studios (London, England)
 Mastered at Sony Music Studios (London, England)

Personnel

 Daniel Bedingfield – writing, production
 Leo Green – saxophone
 Matt Holland – trumpet
 Al Stone – co-production, mixing
 Ned Douglas – additional programming
 Gavin Goldberg – engineering
 John Davis – mastering

Charts

Weekly charts

Year-end charts

Release history

References

Cultural depictions of James Dean
2002 singles
2002 songs
Daniel Bedingfield songs
Island Records singles
Polydor Records singles
Songs written by Daniel Bedingfield
Bedroom pop songs
Electro songs